Save It for the Birds is the first release by straight edge hardcore punk band Down to Nothing.

Track listing
 Save It for the Birds – 1:09     
 One Eighty – 1:48   
 Normal People – 1:53     
 Outcome – 2:28   
 Choke Louder – 1:09     
 3 or 4 Years – 0:44     
 Pet Peeve – 0:29   
 Who Are You to Stay – 1:58    
 Honorable Mention Mr. Starky – 2:15    
 What Goes Around Comes Around – 2:53     
 Fire Escape – 16:23

Personnel
David Wood - vocals
Daniel Spector - drums
Scott Eckert - bass
Alan Long - guitar
Ryan Groat - guitar

Production
Recorded and mixed by Andreas Magnusson
Mastered by Gary Longest

References

2003 debut albums
Down to Nothing albums